Comedy Central Presents is an American stand-up comedy television series created for Comedy Central. It is the network's main half-hour program which highlights either one or a series of stand-up comedians each episode. In 2011, the series ended and Comedy Central replaced it with the revamped The Half Hour, now called Comedy Central Stand-Up Presents, a series of 30-minute stand-up specials.

Episodes

DVDs
Starting in 2008, Comedy Central started releasing "Best of" compilation DVDs, with uncensored audio.  Previously, some of these episodes have appeared on DVDs of comedians' stand-up specials, only they remained censored.

The Best of Comedy Central Presents: Uncensored
This DVD was released on February 5, 2008.  On this DVD, only the audio was uncensored. There is one moment in Dane Cook's special when he gives the finger, which was blurred on television, that remains blurred.

The shows featured on this DVD are:
 Lewis Black (2002) (3rd special)
 Dane Cook (2000)
 Jeff Dunham (2003)
 Jim Gaffigan (2000)
 Mitch Hedberg (1999)
 Demetri Martin (2004)
 Carlos Mencia (2002)
 Brian Regan (2000)

The Best of Comedy Central Presents: Uncensored II
This DVD was released on August 26, 2008.  Unlike the first DVD, this DVD removes all of the commercial bumper titles and isolates the credits of each show.  The shows featured on this DVD are:
 Dave Attell (1999)
 Mike Birbiglia (2004) (1st special)
 Frank Caliendo (2004)
 Zach Galifianakis (2001)
 Stephen Lynch (2008) (2nd special)
 Patton Oswalt (1999)
 Nick Swardson (2006) (2nd special, although the picture of him on the back cover was from his 1st special)
 Daniel Tosh (2002)

References

External links
 
 

Comedy Central original programming
1998 American television series debuts
1990s American stand-up comedy television series
2000s American stand-up comedy television series
2010s American stand-up comedy television series
2011 American television series endings
English-language television shows
Stand-up comedy